Rotonde may refer to:

Locations
Café de la Rotonde, a cafe in Paris, France.
Fontaine de la Rotonde, a fountain in Aix-en-Provence, France.
Simiane-la-Rotonde, a town in France.

Newspaper
La Rotonde, a student newspaper at the University of Ottawa in Canada.